The Grammy Award for Best Rock Album is an award presented at the Grammy Awards, a ceremony that was established in 1958 and originally called the Gramophone Awards, to recording artists for quality albums in the rock music genre. Honors in several categories are presented at the ceremony annually by The Recording Academy of the United States to "honor artistic achievement, technical proficiency and overall excellence in the recording industry, without regard to album sales or chart position".

The award for Best Rock Album was first presented to the band the Rolling Stones in 1995, and the name of the category has remained unchanged since then. According to the category description guide for the 52nd Grammy Awards, the award is presented to "vocal or instrumental rock, hard rock or metal albums containing at least 51% playing time of newly recorded material". 

The award goes to the artist, producer and engineer/mixer, provided they were responsible for more than 50 percent of playing time on the album. Producers and/or engineers/mixers who are responsible for less than 50 percent, as well as the mastering engineer, can apply for a Winners Certificate.

The band Foo Fighters holds the record for the most wins in this category, with five. Two-time winners include Sheryl Crow, Green Day, U2, Cage the Elephant, and Muse. Neil Young jointly holds both the record for the most nominations alongside the Foo Fighters, with seven, and the record for the most nominations without a win. To date, only two women, Sheryl Crow and Alanis Morissette have won the award.

Recipients

 Each year is linked to the article about the Grammy Awards held that year.

Artists with multiple wins

5 wins
 Foo Fighters

2 wins
 Cage the Elephant
 Sheryl Crow
 Green Day
 Muse
 U2

Artists with multiple nominations

7 nominations
 Neil Young
 Foo Fighters

5 nominations
 Tom Petty (3 shared with the Heartbreakers)
 U2

3 nominations
 The Black Keys
 Coldplay
 Elvis Costello
 Crazy Horse
 Sheryl Crow
 John Fogerty
 Kings of Leon
 Dave Matthews Band
 Muse
 Pearl Jam
 Red Hot Chili Peppers
 The Rolling Stones
 Bruce Springsteen

2 nominations
 AC/DC
 Ryan Adams
 Aerosmith
 Jeff Beck
 Cage the Elephant
 Green Day
 Matchbox Twenty
 Metallica
 No Doubt
 Queens of the Stone Age
 The Raconteurs
 Weezer
 Wilco

References
General

  Note: User must select the "Rock" category as the genre under the search feature.
 

Specific

External links

Official site of the Grammy Awards

 
1995 establishments in the United States
Album awards
Awards established in 1995
Rock Album